The 2021–22 Southern Miss Golden Eagles basketball team represented the University of Southern Mississippi during the 2021–22 NCAA Division I men's basketball season. The team was led by third-year head coach Jay Ladner, and played their home games at Reed Green Coliseum in Hattiesburg, Mississippi as members of Conference USA (C-USA).

On October 28, 2021, Southern Miss announced that this would be the last season for the team in the C-USA and they would become a member of the Sun Belt Conference on July 1, 2022.

Previous season
In a season limited due to the ongoing COVID-19 pandemic, the Golden Eagles finished the 2020–21 season 8–17, 4–13 in C-USA play last place in West Division. They lost in the first round of the C-USA tournament to Rice.

Offseason

Departures

Incoming transfers

2021 recruiting class

Roster

Schedule and results

|-
!colspan=9 style=|Exhibition

|-
!colspan=12 style=|Regular season

|-
!colspan=12 style=| C-USA tournament

Source

See also
 2021–22 Southern Miss Lady Eagles basketball team

Notes

References

Southern Miss Golden Eagles basketball seasons
Southern Miss
Southern Miss basketball
Southern Miss basketball